Podemszczyzna  (Podemshchyna) is a village in the administrative district of Gmina Horyniec-Zdrój, within Lubaczów County, Subcarpathian Voivodeship, in south-eastern Poland, close to the border with Ukraine.

References

Podemszczyzna